Przyłęków  is a village in the administrative district of Gmina Świnna, within Żywiec County, Silesian Voivodeship, in southern Poland.

The village has a population of 369.

References

Villages in Żywiec County